Events from the year 1769 in Wales.

Incumbents

Lord Lieutenant of Anglesey - Sir Nicholas Bayly, 2nd Baronet
Lord Lieutenant of Brecknockshire and Lord Lieutenant of Monmouthshire – Thomas Morgan (until 12 April) 
Lord Lieutenant of Caernarvonshire - Thomas Wynn
Lord Lieutenant of Cardiganshire – Wilmot Vaughan, 1st Earl of Lisburne
Lord Lieutenant of Carmarthenshire – George Rice
Lord Lieutenant of Denbighshire - Richard Myddelton  
Lord Lieutenant of Flintshire - Sir Roger Mostyn, 5th Baronet 
Lord Lieutenant of Glamorgan – Other Windsor, 4th Earl of Plymouth
Lord Lieutenant of Merionethshire - William Vaughan
Lord Lieutenant of Montgomeryshire – Henry Herbert, 1st Earl of Powis 
Lord Lieutenant of Pembrokeshire – Sir William Owen, 4th Baronet
Lord Lieutenant of Radnorshire – Edward Harley, 4th Earl of Oxford and Earl Mortimer

Bishop of Bangor – John Egerton (until 10 January); John Ewer
Bishop of Llandaff – John Ewer (until 10 January); Jonathan Shipley (12 February - 8 September); Shute Barrington (from 1 October)
Bishop of St Asaph – Richard Newcome (until 3 June); Jonathan Shipley (from September)
Bishop of St Davids – Charles Moss (from 30 November)

Events
August
John Wesley is turned away from Welshpool Town Hall by the bailiff when he attempts to preach there during his tour of Wales.
Wesley speaks at Newtown, Montgomeryshire, and Llanidloes.
August/September - Robert Williams, a Welsh travelling preacher, arrives in America, the first licensed preacher to obtain permission from John Wesley to address the Methodist societies there.
16 November - Henry Bayley succeeds to the barony of Beaudesert and takes the surname Paget.
date unknown
Daniel Rowland turns down the living of Newport, Pembrokeshire, to stay with his congregation at Llangeitho.
Thomas Pennant employs Moses Griffith to illustrate his books of tours.

Arts and literature

New books
Elizabeth Griffith - The School for Rakes (play)
William Williams (Pantycelyn) - Ffarwel Weledig, vol. 3

Births

2 February - Griffith Williams (Gutyn Peris), poet (died 1838)
23 March - Benjamin Heath Malkin, antiquary and author (died 1842)
3 May - John Vaughan, 3rd Earl of Lisburne, politician (died 1831)
6 December - Thomas Morgan, naval chaplain (died 1851)

Deaths
27 March - John Thomas, Anglican priest and antiquarian, 32
April - Marmaduke Gwynne, father-in-law of Charles Wesley, 77/78
12 April - Thomas Morgan, politician and lawyer, 66
3 June - Richard Newcome, Bishop of St Asaph, 67/68 
July - Goronwy Owen, poet, 46
19 August - Sir Herbert Lloyd, 1st Baronet, politician, 49

References

Wales
Wales